Mall plaza may mean:
 A plaza or public square in a pedestrian mall or shopping mall
 Various shopping malls with “Mall Plaza” in the name
Mallplaza, a chain of shopping malls in South America